Kaya (Turkish: Rock) is designed and developed by Otokar as a mine-protected vehicle (MRAP). It is based on the proven Unimog 500 chassis for high level cross country mobility.

Otokar Kaya comes in two primary variants:

 The first being the armoured personnel carrier (APC) with armoured driver's cabin in the front and armoured troop compartment in the back that can carry 10 fully equipped soldiers. Due to its flexible design, the APC variant can be adapted into an ambulance or a command post vehicle.
 The second variant is a cargo carrier with protected driver's cabin but without the troop compartment in the back, instead having an unprotected flatbed cargo area.

External links
 Otokar

Armoured cars
Armoured fighting vehicles of Turkey
Kaya